This is a list of the managers of the Peru national football team.

List

Information for this list, specifically the managers since 1983, is obtained from the Peruvian sports journal Depor.

Manager game results

See also
List of Peru international footballers
Peruvian Football Federation

References

External links

 
Lists of national association football team managers